The 2008–09 Savannah State Tigers basketball team competed in American basketball on behalf of Savannah State University. The Tigers competed in the NCAA Division I as an independent. The head coach is Horace Broadnax who is in his fourth year.  The team played its home games at Tiger Arena in Savannah, Georgia.  The Tigers entered the season seeking to improve on the 13–18 record posted in the 2007–08 season.

Season notes

Pre-season notes
 - Mark St. Fort, Arnold Louis, Rashad Hassan, Josh Smith and Glen Izevbigie sign letters-of-intent with Savannah State University.

Regular season notes
 - The game against South Carolina State University was moved from Saturday, December 20, 2008, to Wednesday, January 14, 2009. The schedule change was made because inclement weather delayed the return of the South Carolina State men's basketball team from another competition.

Roster

Coaching Staff

Schedule

Awards
Junior guard/forward Jovonni Shuler and freshman forward Rashad Hassan received Honorable Mention honors on the 2008-09 Division I All-Independent men's basketball team.
Chris Linton and Raye Bailey were selected as co-Most Valuable Player for the 2008–09 season.

References

Savannah State Tigers
Savannah State Tigers basketball seasons
Savannah State Tigers basketball team
Savannah State Tigers basketball team